Mohammed Arif (Naseem) Khan (born 21 October 1963) is an Indian politician with the Indian National Congress and vice president of Maharashtra Pradesh Congress Committee (MPCC).

Arif naseem khan photos

Minister of Textiles, Aukaf and Minorities Development and Guardian Minister of Mumbai Suburban District in the Government of Maharashtra.

Mohammed Arif Naseem Khan was the first Muslim to be Minister of State for Home (Urban) of Maharashtra since the state came into existence in 1960.

Mohammad Arif Naseem Khan was awarded with Best MLA Award given by Kashmir To Kerala Foundation with the hands of Deputy Chairman Rajya Sabha Shri Koriyan and Justice Kamal Pasha on 15 January 2017.

Members of Legislative Assembly
Kurla

Key

Members of Legislative Assembly
Chandivali

Key

References

1963 births
Living people
Place of birth missing (living people)
Maharashtra MLAs 2014–2019
People from Mumbai Suburban district
Indian National Congress politicians